The 2015 TCR International Series Sepang round was the first round of the 2015 TCR International Series season. It took place on 28–29 March at the Sepang International Circuit.

It was the first round ever for the TCR International Series. Stefano Comini won the first race, starting from third position, and Jordi Gené gained the second one, both driving a SEAT León Cup Racer.

Classification

Qualifying

Notes
 — Igor Skuz, Frank Yu, Jordi Oriola and Diego Romanini were moved to the back of the grid for having not set a time within the 107% limit.

Race 1

Race 2

Standings after the event

Drivers' Championship standings

Teams' Championship standings

 Note: Only the top five positions are included for both sets of drivers' standings.

References

External links
TCR International Series official website

Sepang
TCR International Series